Fictibacillus phosphorivorans is a Gram-positive, aerobic and spore-forming bacterium from the genus of Fictibacillus.

References

External links 

Type strain of Fictibacillus phosphorivorans at BacDive -  the Bacterial Diversity Metadatabase

Bacillaceae
Bacteria described in 2013